Svetlana Orlova may refer to:

 (1946−2003), Soviet actress, Punisher (1968 film)
Svetlana Orlova (actress) (b. 1956), Soviet and Russian actress
Svetlana Orlova (politician) (b. 1954), Russian politician
Svetlana Melnikova (b. 1951), née Svetlana Orlova, Soviet athlete
Svetlana Solo (b. 1970), professional name of Russian artist Svetlana Orlova